Acacia uliginosa is a shrub of the genus Acacia and the subgenus Phyllodineae. It is native to an area in the South West and Great Southern regions of Western Australia.

Ecology
It blooms in September and produces yellow flowers.

See also
List of Acacia species

References

uliginosa
Acacias of Western Australia
Taxa named by Bruce Maslin